Rathcabbin (Ráth Cabáin in Irish) often Rathcabban is a small village and an electoral district situated at the very north of County Tipperary in Ireland. The village is located off the R489 regional road between Portumna, County Galway and Birr, County Offaly. It is 5 km east of the River Shannon and Lough Derg.

The village contains 2 bars (Kelly's and Brophy's) and a village shop (Kelly's).

The modern church of Our Lady Queen of Ireland stands at the focal point crossroads of the village. The church was dedicated in 1984.

Rathcabbin was used as a filming location for the 2007 film Garage. Parts of the film were shot in the village over a six-week period in summer 2006, and the film's premiere was held in Rathcabbin in 2007.

At Redwood is a raised bog located where the Little Brosna River joins the Shannon and established in 1991 it includes area of bog dome, fen and bog pools. The area is in state ownership and forms part of the Shannon Callows, an area classified as being of Special Area of Conservation.

The new Dáil constituency of Offaly incorporates twenty four electoral divisions from Tipperary North, including Rathcabbin.

Sport
Hurlers from the village play for the parish team Lorrha-Dorrha GAA at St. Ruadhan's Park at Moatfield, Redwood.

Notable people
 Tom Duffy, hurler born in Rathcabbin
 Charles Octavius Head, army colonel and author born in Rathcabbin
 Anne Young (nurse), founder of the first Irish school of general nursing born in Rathcabbin

See also
 List of towns and villages in Ireland

References

Towns and villages in County Tipperary
Articles on towns and villages in Ireland possibly missing Irish place names